Honour & Blood is the fourth album by the British heavy metal band Tank, released in 1984. By the time of this album Algy Ward was the last original member of the group remaining, as the Brabbs brothers had been replaced by Cliff Evans on guitar and Graeme Crallan on drums (reuniting Crallan with his former bandmate in White Spirit, Mick Tucker). The album follows much the same format as the band's previous album This Means War, with seven songs, several quite lengthy, of melodic heavy metal primarily about the topic of war. However, the band explores some different subject matter on side two, as "W.M.L.A." and "Too Tired to Wait for Love", express frustration in love, while "Chain of Fools" is a cover of the 1967 hit by Aretha Franklin.

Track listing 
All songs written by Algy Ward and Mick Tucker except where noted.
Side one
 "The War Drags Ever On" – 8:14
 "When All Hell Freezes Over" – 5:56
 "Honour and Blood" – 6:31

Side two
 "Chain of Fools" (Don Covay) – 4:08
 "W.M.L.A. (Wasting My Life Away)" – 5:17
 "Too Tired to Wait for Love" (Algy Ward) – 4:37
 "Kill" – 8:00

CD edition bonus track
Various editions of the album have been available on CD with the following bonus track:

 "The Man Who Never Was" (from the Japanese CD version of Honour & Blood) – 4:30

Personnel 
Tank
 Algy Ward – vocals, bass, keyboards
 Cliff Evans – guitar
 Mick Tucker – guitar
 Graeme Crallan – drums

Production
 Alvin Clark, Peter Rackham - engineers

References

1984 albums
Tank (band) albums
Music for Nations albums